Robert Browne (died 1623), of Walcot Hall, Northamptonshire, was an English politician.

He was a Member (MP) of the Parliament of England for Lichfield in 1601.

References

16th-century births
1623 deaths
16th-century English people
People from Northamptonshire (before 1974)
English MPs 1601